The Mansfield News Journal is a daily newspaper based in Mansfield, Ohio, that serves Richland, Ashland and Crawford counties, as well as parts of Morrow, Knox and Huron counties in the north central part of the state.

History
The News Journal was formed by the merger of the Mansfield News and the Mansfield Journal in 1932. The paper celebrated its 75th anniversary in December 2007.

Overview

Ted Daniels is the newspaper's managing editor. Daniels filled the role in January 2016 after the retirement of longtime editor Tom Brennan.

The paper is owned by Gannett (The USA Today Network of Ohio) and has downsized its print operation in recent years to focus more upon online content.

Awards
The newspaper's web site was chosen the state's best among newspapers in its circulation category in 2007 in the annual AP contest.

See also

References

External links 
 

Mansfield, Ohio
Newspapers published in Ohio
Newspapers established in 1930
Gannett publications
1930 establishments in Ohio